

Coenwalh (or Cenwealh; died between 793 and 796) was a medieval Bishop of London.

Coenwalh was consecrated between 789 and 793. He died between 793 and 796.

Citations

References

External links
 

Bishops of London
8th-century deaths
Year of birth unknown
8th-century English bishops